Paul Allen Wood Shaffer  (born November 28, 1949) is a Canadian singer, composer, actor, author, comedian, and musician who served as David Letterman's musical director, band leader, and sidekick on the entire run of both Late Night with David Letterman (1982–1993) and Late Show with David Letterman (1993–2015).

Early years
Shaffer was born in 1949 in Toronto, and raised in Fort William (now part of Thunder Bay), Ontario, Canada, the son of Shirley and Bernard Shaffer. His father, a lawyer, was a jazz aficionado while his mother loved show tunes. When Shaffer was 12, his parents took him on a trip to Las Vegas where they took in Nat King Cole and other shows; this was an experience Shaffer described later as "life changing" and led to his decision to become a performer. As a child, Shaffer took piano lessons, and in his teenage years played the organ in a band called Fabulous Fugitives with his schoolmates in Thunder Bay. Later, he performed with the "Flash Landing Band" at different venues around Edmonton and the interior of British Columbia. Educated at the University of Toronto, he began playing with jazz guitarist Tisziji Muñoz, performing in bands around the bars there, where he found an interest in musicals, and completed his studies, with a Bachelor of Arts degree in sociology in 1971.

Shaffer appears briefly, playing an organ at an outdoor wedding, in North of Superior (1971), an early IMAX documentary shot in northern Ontario.

Career

Godspell to Saturday Night Live
Shaffer began his music career in 1972 when Stephen Schwartz invited him to be the musical director for the Toronto production of Godspell, starring Victor Garber, Gilda Radner, Martin Short, Eugene Levy, Dave Thomas, and Andrea Martin. He went on to play piano for the Schwartz Broadway show The Magic Show in 1974, then became a member of the house band on NBC's Saturday Night Live (SNL) television program from 1975 to 1980 (except for a brief departure in 1977). Though Shaffer was at the piano and appeared to be directing the band's actions, Howard Shore was credited as SNL'''s musical director, eventually turning the actual conducting of the band to Howard Johnson. Shaffer also regularly appeared in the show's sketches, notably as the pianist for Bill Murray's Nick the Lounge Singer character, and as Don Kirshner. He also appeared as a keyboardist on the 1978 album Desire Wire, recorded by pop/rock star, musician, and backing vocalist Cindy Bullens.

Shaffer occasionally teamed up with the Not Ready for Prime-Time Players off the show, as well, including work on Gilda Radner's highly successful Broadway show and as the musical director for John Belushi and Dan Aykroyd whenever they recorded or performed as the Blues Brothers. Shaffer was to appear in the duo's 1980 film, but as he revealed in October 2009 on CBS Sunday Morning, Belushi dropped him from the project. In a memo to fellow SNL colleagues, Belushi said that he was unhappy that Shaffer was spending so much time on a studio record for Radner. Belushi said that he had tried to talk Shaffer out of working on the album in the first place to avoid sharing Shaffer's talents with another SNL-related project. Shaffer later reported that he was in (unrequited) love with Gilda Radner. He went on to appear in 1998's Blues Brothers 2000.

In 1977, Shaffer played on the Mark & Clark Band's hit song "Worn Down Piano".

Shaffer left SNL in 1977 for a few months to co-star with Greg Evigan in A Year at the Top, a short-lived CBS sitcom in which Shaffer and Evigan play two musicians from Idaho who relocate to Hollywood, where they are regularly tempted by a famous promoter (who is actually the devil's son), played by Gabriel Dell, to sell their souls in exchange for a year of stardom. Though the series only lasted a few episodes, a soundtrack album was released.

Following the series' cancellation, Shaffer returned to SNL. In the spring of 1980, Shaffer became the first person to say "fuck" on SNL. That year, SNL parodied The Troggs Tapes with a medieval musical sketch featuring Shaffer, Bill Murray, Harry Shearer, and a "special guest appearance" by John Belushi (who had left the show the previous year). In the middle of a long tirade that featured repeated use of the word "flogging", Shaffer inadvertently uttered the forbidden word. It not only escaped the censors in the live broadcast and the West Coast taped airing, but also reappeared in the summer rerun, and even in the syndicated versions of the show for several years. Shaffer, at Letterman's urging, related the story on the first episode of Late Night. In February 2015, Shaffer appeared on the 40th-anniversary special of SNL, playing music to Bill Murray's lounge-singer character, a love song from the movie Jaws.

Collaboration with David Letterman

Beginning in 1982, Shaffer served as musical director for David Letterman's late night talk shows: as leader of "The World's Most Dangerous Band" for Late Night with David Letterman (1982–1993) on NBC, for which he also composed the theme song, and as leader of the CBS Orchestra for the Late Show with David Letterman (1993–2015) on CBS. Letterman consistently maintained that the show's switch to CBS was because NBC "caught Paul stealing pens" or some other trivial reason. Shaffer guest-hosted the show four times when Letterman was unavailable: February 9 and 11, 2000, during Letterman's recovery from his quintuple heart bypass surgery; March 24, 2003, when Letterman was suffering from shingles; and January 19, 2005, when Letterman went to receive an award for his racing team's victory in the 2004 Indianapolis 500.

Shaffer recorded the synthesizer solo in the 1982 song "Goodbye to You" by the band Scandal. He used his Oberheim OB-Xa to emulate a 1960s organ sound.

Shaffer wrote and performs the bridging music on Letterman's current Netflix series My Next Guest Needs No Introduction with David Letterman which premiered in 2018. After Netflix announced publicly that it had given the series an order, Shaffer received a phone call from Letterman asking him to work on the show. Soon after, Shaffer began to receive cuts of episodes from the first season and he started to put music in afterwards where the director thought it was needed. In developing the sound of the show's music, Shaffer initially looked to Letterman for guidance. Finding none, he remembered  his and Letterman's shared love for the sort of music produced at the Muscle Shoals Sound Studio in Sheffield, Alabama, describing it as "the honesty you hear, the southern soul feeling". The score initially included drums, but the show's producers and director thought that the music should "feel like it's Dave's old friend Paul playing", so it was ultimately stripped down to solely include piano and organ.

Musical collaboration
In 1984, Shaffer played keyboards for The Honeydrippers, a group formed in 1981 by former Led Zeppelin frontman Robert Plant, on their only studio album, The Honeydrippers: Volume One. The album included the hit single "Sea of Love" which reached number one on Billboard's adult contemporary chart in 1984 and number three on its Hot 100 chart in 1985.

He released two solo albums, 1989's Coast to Coast, and 1993's The World's Most Dangerous Party, produced by rock musician Todd Rundgren. Shaffer has also recorded with a wide range of artists, including Donald Fagen, Ronnie Wood, Grand Funk Railroad, Diana Ross, B.B. King, Asleep at the Wheel, Cyndi Lauper, Carl Perkins, Yoko Ono, Blues Traveler, Jeff Healey, Cher, Barry Manilow, Chicago, Luba, Robert Burns, George Clinton, Bootsy Collins, Nina Hagen, Robert Plant, Peter Criss, Scandal, Brian Wilson, Late Show regular Warren Zevon, jazz trumpeters Miles Davis and Lew Soloff, jazz saxophonist Lou Marini, and bluegrass legend Earl Scruggs. In 1982, he co-wrote "It's Raining Men" with Paul Jabara. It was number one on the US Billboard Hot Dance Club Play charts, a number-two hit in the UK for The Weather Girls in 1984, and a UK number-one remake for Geri Halliwell in 2001. Shaffer and the World's Most Dangerous Band performed the Chuck Berry song "Roll Over Beethoven" for the 1992 film Beethoven.

Shaffer has served as musical director and producer for the Rock and Roll Hall of Fame induction ceremony since its inception in 1986 and filled the same role for the 1996 Olympic Games closing ceremonies from Atlanta, Georgia. Shaffer also served as musical director for Fats Domino and Friends, a Cinemax special that included Ray Charles, Jerry Lee Lewis, and Ron Wood.

Shaffer has hosted Musicians Hall of Fame and Museum induction concert and ceremonies.

In 2017, Shaffer reunited with his band, resuming its previous name, and recorded the self-titled album Paul Shaffer and the World's Most Dangerous Band. Shaffer and the band released their album in March and then went on tour, as well, as making appearances on both Jimmy Kimmel Live and The Late Show with Stephen Colbert, for which Shaffer and the band returned to the Ed Sullivan Theater for the first time since Letterman's finale two years earlier. In 2023, the band returned to 30 Rockefeller Plaza to act as the house band for one episode of The Tonight Show Starring Jimmy Fallon while the regular band, The Roots, prepared for the 65th Annual Grammy Awards in Los Angeles.

Movie appearances
Shaffer has appeared in a number of motion pictures over the years, including a small role (Artie Fufkin of Polymer Records) in Rob Reiner's This Is Spinal Tap, Blues Brothers 2000, a scene with Miles Davis in the Bill Murray film Scrooged, and as a passenger in John Travolta's taxicab in Look Who's Talking Too. In addition, Shaffer lent his voice to Disney's animated feature and television series Hercules, as the character Hermes. 

Around 1998, Shaffer was on Hollywood Squares.

The following year, he appeared in Blues Traveler's video for the song "Hook".

Other television and radio appearances
He hosted Happy New Year, America in 1994 on CBS.

Shaffer was considered for the role of George Costanza in Seinfeld, but never returned the call from Jerry Seinfeld that offered him the role
In 2001, Shaffer hosted the VH1 game show Cover Wars with DJ/model Sky Nellor. The show featured cover bands competing for the ultimate series win. Each week, Shaffer signed off with, "Just because you're in a cover band, it doesn't mean you're not a star." The show lasted 13 episodes and featured celebrity judges including Kevin Bacon, Nile Rodgers, Cyndi Lauper, and Ace Frehley.

Shaffer served as musical director for 2001's The Concert for New York City, and accompanied Adam Sandler's "Opera Man" sketch and the Backstreet Boys' "Quit Playing Games (with My Heart)".

In 2002, he hosted the infamous Friars Club Roast of Chevy Chase on Comedy Central in which the presenters' insults directed at the comedian were so vicious, Shaffer reportedly had to console him afterwards.

Shaffer hosts the 60-second radio vignettes called "Paul Shaffer's Day in Rock". These audio shorts were first produced for Envision Radio Networks and debuted in 2007 on New York station WAXQ-FM.

In 2008, Shaffer made a cameo appearance at the beginning of the Law & Order: Criminal Intent season-seven episode "Vanishing Act".

In February 2013, he appeared in an episode of the sitcom How I Met Your Mother titled "P.S. I Love You", in which the character of Robin (Cobie Smulders) is revealed to have been obsessed with him. The letters "P.S." in the episode title refer to Paul Shaffer.

Shaffer was the musical director for A Very Murray Christmas, a 2015 Netflix variety special starring Bill Murray in which Shaffer also appears and performs extensively.

In October 2017, Shaffer returned to the late-night stage to perform with the band on Jimmy Kimmel Live!In December 2018, he made a cameo appearance in an episode of the Canadian sitcom Schitt's Creek, during which he played the piano at a Christmas party. The episode, titled "Merry Christmas, Johnny Rose," also reunited him with his former Godspell colleague Eugene Levy.

Shaffer competed on the second season of the TV series The Masked Singer as "Skeleton".

In 2019, Shaffer began hosting Paul Shaffer Plus One, a monthly talk show on SiriusXM and AXS TV that featured Shaffer interviewing colleagues in the music industry such as Sammy Hagar, Graham Nash, ZZ Top's Billy Gibbons, and Donald Fagen of Steely Dan.

Charity work
Since 2002, he has been the national spokesperson for Epilepsy Canada. On September 29, 2005, Shaffer made a major contribution to Lakehead University to dedicate the fifth-floor ATAC boardroom to his father Bernard Shaffer, inaugural member of the board of governors. In June 2006, he received a star on Canada's Walk of Fame.

In 2005, along with Steven Van Zandt, he organized a benefit for Mike Smith (formerly of The Dave Clark Five), who had suffered a paralysing fall at his home in Spain. Shaffer cites Mike Smith as an early influence.

In 2012, Shaffer appeared in 12-12-12: The Concert for Sandy Relief, where Shaffer accompanied Adam Sandler. The concert raised money for the people who were affected by Hurricane Sandy in October 2012. Later in 2012, Shaffer appeared in a skit of SNL Christmas, which aired on Saturday, December 15, 2012. He appeared playing the piano and singing for the host Martin Short.

Shaffer is a member of Canadian charity Artists Against Racism.

Memoir
Shaffer's memoir, We'll Be Here for the Rest of Our Lives: A Swingin' Show-biz Saga (co-authored by David Ritz) was published on October 6, 2009. The same day, he made an appearance as a guest on The Late Show.

Honours
The National Black Sports and Entertainment Hall of Fame inducted Paul Shaffer in 2002 for his part in opening doors in the entertainment industry for African-Americans.

Shaffer was inducted into the Order of Canada, Canada's highest honour, in 2007.

In May 2015, the Ride of Fame honoured Paul Shaffer with a double-decker sightseeing bus in New York City to commemorate his long run as the leader of the CBS Orchestra for the Late Show with David Letterman.

In 2010, Shaffer appeared with Bachman & Turner at the Roseland Ballroom in New York. His appearance was included on the live album recorded on that date.

In 2002, a street that surrounds the Thunder Bay Community Auditorium in his hometown was renamed Paul Shaffer Drive. Shaffer has also received two honorary doctorates, including one from Lakehead University.

Personal life
Shaffer has been married to Cathy Vasapoli, a former talent booker on Good Morning America, since 1990. They have two children, Victoria and Will.

Discography
1989: Coast to Coast1993: The World's Most Dangerous Party2017: Paul Shaffer & The World's Most Dangerous Band'' (Sire Records)

References

External links

Late Show UK fansite

 
 Article 1 at thecanadianencyclopedia.ca
 Article 2 at thecanadianencyclopedia.ca
 
Paul Shaffer, Jewish United Fund
Paul Shaffer Interview NAMM Oral History Library (2017)

1949 births
Living people
Canadian composers
Canadian male composers
Canadian emigrants to the United States
21st-century Canadian keyboardists
21st-century Canadian pianists
Canadian organists
Male organists
Canadian male singers
Canadian television personalities
Canadian male voice actors
Paul Shaffer and the World's Most Dangerous Band members
Grammy Award winners
Members of the Order of Canada
Male actors from Ontario
Musicians from Thunder Bay
Writers from Thunder Bay
Saturday Night Live Band members
Scandal (American band) members
Sire Records artists
The Blues Brothers members
University of Toronto alumni
Canadian comedy musicians
Canadian memoirists
The Honeydrippers members
Canadian male pianists
21st-century organists